was a court noble (kuge) of the early Edo period. Born to Nijō Haruyoshi and adopted by Takatsukasa Tadafuyu, he revived the lineage of the Takatsukasa family. In 1606 he was appointed Kampaku, a regent position which he left two years later. In 1658 he died at age 92. With a daughter of the daimyō Sassa Narimasa, Teruko, he had a son, Nobuhisa, and a daughter, Takako, who married Tokugawa Iemitsu in 1623.

Genealogy 
Father: Nijō Haruyoshi
Mother: Fushimi-no-miya Sadaatsu
Wife: Sassa Teruko
son: Takatsukasa Nobuhisa
daughter: Takatsukasa Takako, married Tokugawa Iemitsu
Concubine: Lady Shirakawa
son: Matsuidara Nobuhira
Concubine: unknown name
Daughter: unknown name

References
https://web.archive.org/web/20181118084314/http://www.geocities.jp/kimkaz_labo/taka.html

1565 births
1658 deaths
Fujiwara clan
Takatsukasa family
Nijō family